Irecê is a municipality in Bahia, Brazil.  it had a population of 73,524 people.  by road northwest of Salvador.Located in the northern region of Chapada Diamantina.  It is an agricultural town known for growing black beans and being a wine-producing region.

Notable landmarks 
It is the home of the "Academia Ireceense de Letras e Artes." It was also the site the Universal Church of the Kingdom of God chose for an industrial kibbutz.

References

External links 
 Official site
 Irece.org

Municipalities in Bahia